
Year 370 BC was a year of the pre-Julian Roman calendar. At the time, it was known as the Year of the Tribunate of Capitolinus, Medullinus, Praetextatus, Cornelius, Volusus and Poplicola (or, less frequently, year 384 Ab urbe condita). The denomination 370 BC for this year has been used since the early medieval period, when the Anno Domini calendar era became the prevalent method in Europe for naming years.

Events 
 By place 
 Greece 
 The Spartans under King Agesilaus II invade Arcadia. After appealing in vain to the Athenians for help, Arcadia turns to the Thebans. Epaminondas of Thebes arrives with an army, finds that the Spartans have retired and follows them.
 With the support of Thebes, the Arcadian capital city of Megalopolis is completed and a democratic system is set up with an Assembly of Ten Thousand and a Council of fifty.
 The tagus of Thessaly, Jason of Pherae, dies, after making Thessaly a powerful force in Greek politics.

 By topic 
 Art 
 The sculptor Praxiteles begins his active career in Athens (approximate date).

 Mathematics 
 Eudoxus of Cnidus develops the method of exhaustion for mathematically determining the area under a curve.

Births 
 Marcus Valerius Corvus, Roman hero (d. c. 270 BC)
 Theophrastus, Greek philosopher, a native of Eressos in Lesbos, the successor of Aristotle in the Peripatetic school (d. c. 285 BC) Chanakya

Deaths 
 Agesipolis II, Agiad king of Sparta
 Democritus of Abdera, Greek philosopher (approximate date) (b. c. 460 BC)
 Hippocrates of Cos, Greek physician (b. c. 460 BC)
 Jason of Pherae, ruler of Thessaly

References